The 2019 Jin'an Open was a professional tennis tournament played on outdoor hard courts. It was the third edition of the tournament which was part of the 2019 ITF Women's World Tennis Tour. It took place in Lu'an, China between 6 and 12 May 2019.

Singles main-draw entrants

Seeds

 1 Rankings are as of 29 April 2019.

Other entrants
The following players received wildcards into the singles main draw:
  Guo Hanyu
  Sun Xuliu
  Wang Meiling
  Zhu Wanning

The following player received entry as a special exempt:
  Eudice Chong

The following players received entry from the qualifying draw:
  Catherine Harrison
  Paige Hourigan
  Jiang Xinyu
  Kang Jiaqi
  Ma Yexin
  Anastasia Nefedova
  Akiko Omae
  Sun Ziyue

Champions

Singles

 Han Xinyun def.  Duan Yingying, 4–6, 6–2, 6–2

Doubles

 Beatrice Gumulya /  You Xiaodi def.  Mai Minokoshi /  Erika Sema, 6–1, 7–5

References

External links
 2019 Jin'an Open at ITFtennis.com

2019 ITF Women's World Tennis Tour
2019 in Chinese tennis
Jin'an Open